Winter cherry  may refer to:

Solanaceae (nightshade plants) 
 Physalis alkekengi (Chinese lantern)
 other species of Physalis
 Solanum pseudocapsicum (Jerusalem cherry), especially under its synonym S. capsicastrum (false Jerusalem cherry)
 Withania somnifera (ashwaganda)

Other uses 
Winter Cherry, a 1985 Soviet  film
Winter Cherry complex, a shopping mall in Kemerovo, Russia; the site of the 2018 Kemerovo fire